50th CAS Awards
February 22, 2014

Motion Picture – Live Action: 
Gravity
Motion Picture – Animated: 
Frozen

The 50th Cinema Audio Society Awards were held on February 22, 2014, in the Bunker Hill Ballroom of the OMNI Los Angeles Hotel at California Plaza, Los Angeles, honoring outstanding achievements in sound mixing in film and television of 2013.



Winners and nominees

10th CAS Technical Achievement Awards
 Production: Sound Devices, LLC – 633 Mixer/Recorder
 Post-production: iZotope – RX 3 Advanced

CAS Honorary Awards
 Career Achievement Honors: Andy Nelson
 Filmmaker Award: Edward Zwick

References

 
 
 Cinema Audio Society Awards 2013 on IMDb
 
 
 
 

2013 film awards
2013 television awards
Cinema Audio Society Awards
2014 in American cinema